Julia Hassler (born 27 February 1993) is an Olympic and national-record holding swimmer from Liechtenstein. She swam for and was Liechtenstein closing-ceremony flagbearer at the 2012 Olympics. She has also swam for Liechtenstein at several other international competitions including the: World Championships (2011), Games of the Small States of Europe (2009, 2011, 2013), European Championships (2014), Short Course Worlds (2010, 2012) and Youth Olympics (2010).

As of March 2015, she holds Liechtenstein Records, both long course (50m) and short course (25m), in the: 200, 400 and 800 frees; 50, 100 and 200 flies; and 400 IM. She also holds the national record in the long course 1500 free.

At the 2012 Olympics, she was one of three athletes to compete for Liechtenstein. She swam the 400 and 800 freestyles, setting national records in both (4:12.99 and 8:35.18)., finishing 27th in the 400 and 17th in the 800.

At the 2016 Summer Olympics, she competed in the 800 m freestyle event. She placed 21st in the heats with a time of 8:38.19 and did not qualify for the final. She was the flagbearer for Liechtenstein during the Parade of Nations.

References

External links 

 
 

1993 births
Liechtenstein female swimmers
Swimmers at the 2010 Summer Youth Olympics
Living people
Olympic swimmers of Liechtenstein
Swimmers at the 2012 Summer Olympics
Swimmers at the 2016 Summer Olympics
Swimmers at the 2020 Summer Olympics
Female butterfly swimmers
Liechtenstein female freestyle swimmers
Female medley swimmers